The men's 100 metres event at the 1991 Pan American Games was held in Havana, Cuba on 4 and 5 August.

Medalists

Results

Heats

Wind:Heat 1: -2.3 m/s, Heat 2: -1.5 m/s, Heat 3: -1.2 m/s

Final
Wind: -1.1 m/s

References

Athletics at the 1991 Pan American Games
1991